Marcaria is a comune (municipality) in the Province of Mantua in the Italian region Lombardy, located about  southeast of Milan and about  west of Mantua.

Marcaria borders the following municipalities: Acquanegra sul Chiese, Borgo Virgilio, Bozzolo, Castellucchio, Curtatone, Gazoldo degli Ippoliti, Gazzuolo, Redondesco, San Martino dall'Argine, Viadana.

The Renaissance writer Baldassarre Castiglione was born at Casatico in 1478.

References

External links
 Official website

Cities and towns in Lombardy